Léonce Marie-Joseph, Comte de Saint-Martin-de-Paylha (31 October 1886 - 10 June 1954), shortened to and more well known by Léonce de Saint-Martin, was a French organist and composer.

Biography 
He was born in Albi (Tarn). As the successor of Louis Vierne in 1937, he was organist at Notre-Dame de Paris until his death in 1954.

Saint-Martin was heavily attacked for his appointment to Notre Dame by the Cathedral chapter, since it was done without competition. Saint-Martin was also mainly self-taught, and did not enter the conservatory, and thus was deemed to be an amateur organist. These accusations were easily seen to be false by eye-witnesses, such as Pierre Cochereau, who took Saint-Martin's place as titular organist after the latter's death. An example of his fine skill can be seen in his organ compositions, filled with emotional and spiritual writing. Saint-Martin was also a pious man, as he stated "but whatever the Good Lord wills is fine by me" concerning his death. His virtuosity can be seen by the fact that he played Marcel Dupré's op. 7 to the satisfaction of Dupré's wife, Jeanne Pascouau, at a time when Charles-Marie Widor stated that these pieces were unplayable.

He later died in Paris.

On the 10th anniversary of his death, the association "Les Amis de Léonce de Saint-Martin" was created on February, 27th of 1963. The association organise a special event every 10 years since his death, which has included artists such as Pierre Cochereau, Jehan Revert, Michel Chapuis and Pierre Pincemaille.

He was a distant relative of philosopher Louis Claude de Saint-Martin.

Works

For organ solo 
 Six pièces brèves op. 11 (1926)
 Prélude
 Pastorale
 Intermezzo
 Andante
 Choral
 Final
 Offertoire pour Fêtes simples de la Sainte Vierge op. 10 (1929)
 Suite cyclique op. 11 (1930)
 Prélude
 Fugue
 Cantilène
 Carillon
 Scherzo de concert op. 18 (1930)
 Paraphrase du psaume 136: super flumina Babylonis op. 15
 Tristesse des Hébreux captifs de Babylone
 Lamentation au souvenir de Jérusalem
 Babylone la Superbe
 Les Hébreux maudissent leurs vainqueurs
 Offertoire sur deux noëls op. 19 (1937)
 Stèle pour un artiste défunt (dedicated to Louis Vierne) op. 20 (1938)
 Postlude de fête «Te Deum laudamus» op. 21 (1938)
 Berceuse de Noël op. 25 (1939)
 Genèse op. 26 (1940)
 La marche sous la malédiction
 Les éléments et la vie
 Mort d'Adam ; prière et mort d'Ève
 Passacaille op. 28 (1940)
 Choral-Prélude pour le temps de l'Avent op. 31 (1940)
 Venez, divin Messie op. 32 (1940)
 Pastorale op. 35 (1942)
 Le salut à la Vierge op. 34 (1944)
 Toccata de la Libération op. 37 (1944)
 À la gloire de saint Louis op. 33 (1945)
 Toccata et fugue de la Résurrection op. 38 (1945)
 Symphonie Dominicale op. 39 (1946-1948)
 Prélude
 Aria
 Fantaisie-Choral
 Prière
 Postlude
 Symphonie Mariale op. 40 (1948-1949)
 Prélude
 Salve Regina
 Ave Regina
 Alma Redemptoris
 Postlude
 Cantique Spirituel op. 41 (1950)

For choir 
 Tu es Petrus (4 voices and 2 organs) op. 7 (1929)
 Messe en Mi (4 voices, 2 organs, 3 trumpets and 3 trombones ad lib.) op. 13 (1931-1932)
 Ave Maria (voices and organ) op. 17 (1934)
 Panis angelicus (choir and organ) op. 27 (1940)
 Kyrie funèbre (4 voices and 2 organs, brass ad lib.) op. 36 (1944) 
 Magnificat (4 voices and 2 organs) op. 42  (1950-1951)

For organ and other instruments 
 In Memoriam, Paraphrase de l'Hymne national (organ and brass)

Mélodies (voices and piano) 
 Soir d'automne (1910)
 Six mélodies
 Paris d'avril
 Grisaille
 Mariez-vous
 Cimetière de Paris
 L'heure du thé
 Vampire
 L'enfant
 Hymne à la très chère op. 13 (1932)
 Sur les balcons du ciel op. 14 (1932)
 Midi
 Novembre
 Hiver
 Ivresse au printemps
 Esquisse on a poem from Tristan Klingsor (1945)
 Espérance (1952)

Transcriptions 
 Concerto Grosso n°8 « Pour une nuit de Noël » - Corelli
 Passacaille - F. Couperin le Grand
 La grande Porte de Kiev - Moussorgsky
 ''Le vol du bourdon'' - Rimsky-Korsakov
 Saint-François de Paule marchant sur les flots - Liszt

Transcribed Improvisations 
 Improvisation pour l'élévation - Transcribed by Jason Baruk
 Improvisation Libre - Transcribed by Jason Baruk
 Entrée Improvisé pour Noël - Transcribed by Jason Baruk

See also

Bibliography 
 Jean Guérard, Léonce de Saint-Martin à Notre-Dame de Paris (la vie et l'œuvre), Paris, Éditions de l'Officine, 2005, 328 p. (www.publiecriprint.com)

External links 
 Musica et Memoria Biography of Léonce de Saint-Martin by Jean Guérard (Les Amis de Léonce de Saint-Martin).
 
 Léonce de Saint Martin. Interlude pour grand orgue pour l'Élévation (1932). Andrew Pink (2021) Exordia ad missam.

French classical organists
French male organists
People from Albi
1886 births
1954 deaths
20th-century organists
20th-century French male musicians
20th-century classical musicians
Male classical organists